The Tampa Bay Bandits were a professional American football team in the United States Football League (USFL) which was based in Tampa, Florida. The Bandits were a charter member of the USFL and was the only franchise to have the same principal owner (John F. Bassett), head coach (Steve Spurrier), and home field (Tampa Stadium) during the league's three seasons of play (1983–1985). The Bandits were one of the most successful teams in the short-lived spring football league both on the field and at the ticket booth. Spurrier's "Bandit Ball" offense led them to three winning seasons and two playoff appearances, and their exciting brand of play combined with innovative local marketing helped the Bandits lead the league in attendance. However, the franchise folded along with the rest of the USFL when the league suspended play after the 1985 season.

Prominent alumni from the Bandits include future NFL Pro Bowlers Nate Newton and Gary Anderson and coach Steve Spurrier, who spent 25 years coaching college football after his successful first stint as a head coach with the Bandits and was enshrined in the College Football Hall of Fame.

History

Preparing to play

Origins
The Tampa Bay Bandits' primary founder was Canadian businessman John F. Bassett, who was still in litigation against the NFL over his previous Memphis Southmen franchise from the World Football League in the mid-1970s. Bassett was initially skeptical about getting into another football venture. However, he soon warmed up to the USFL after discovering that he was nowhere as well off as the other owners. While he had been by far the richest owner in the WFL, he realized that he would be one of the poorest owners in the USFL. Believing that the USFL was on far stronger financial ground than the WFL ever had been, he agreed to sign on. Bassett had a part-time home in the Tampa Bay Area, and when the USFL announced its twelve charter franchises in May 1982, Bassett was introduced as the majority owner of the as-yet unnamed team in Tampa along with Miami attorney Steve Arky.

Establishment in Tampa
After it was decided that the franchise would play in Tampa, several minority owners bought stakes, among them Hollywood star Burt Reynolds, a former college football player at Florida State who was one of the most popular motion picture actors in the world. The team was soon dubbed the "Bandits", and although it was widely assumed that the name referenced Reynolds' role in the hit Smokey and the Bandit movies, Bassett said that the mascot had been chosen before Reynolds joined the ownership group and instead came from the name of Bassett's daughter's German Shepherd. Reynolds was prominently involved in the Bandits' early marketing campaigns, and the cover of the team's first media guide featured a photo of the actor wearing a Bandits jacket and trucker hat.

Also building interest was the hiring of Steve Spurrier as head coach and offensive coordinator in November 1982. Spurrier was well known in the area as a Heisman Trophy-winning college star for the University of Florida Gators and the Tampa Bay Buccaneers' first starting quarterback, and had most recently spent three seasons as a record-setting offensive coordinator at Duke University before accepting his first head coaching job with the Bandits. Though Bassett had also considered several established coaches with NFL experience, he chose Spurrier due to his deep connections to the state of Florida and his reputation as an innovative young offensive coach; Spurrier was 37 when hired, making him the youngest head coach in professional football at the time. At Spurrier's introductory press conference, Bassett joked that the he knew that he'd found the right coach when he discovered that the Spurrier family also had a dog named Bandit.

Bandit Ball
The Bandits began play in 1983 in Tampa Stadium, and were immediately more successful than the area's NFL franchise, the Tampa Bay Buccaneers, with whom they shared a home field (though the Bucs played in the fall and early winter while the Bandits played in the spring and early summer). The Bandits narrowly missed the playoffs in their first season and made the postseason the next two years. Spurrier's aggressive offense was usually one of the best in the league; Bandits players are among the USFL career leaders in touchdown passes (John Reaves, 4th), touchdown receptions (Eric Truvillion, 2nd), and rushing touchdowns (Gary Anderson, 3rd). However, an average defense and Bassett's insistence on adhering to the USFL's original financial plan while other franchises spent millions on free agent signings kept the team from serious championship contention.

The Bandits were also successful off the field. They drew the highest average attendance over the three-year history of the USFL, coming in second in attendance in 1983 and leading the league in that category in 1984 and 1985 with over 40,000 fans per game. Also, their memorabilia outsold that of the Buccaneers in the Tampa Bay area. A fan-friendly atmosphere (including a theme song, "Bandit Ball", penned and sung by Reynolds' friend Jerry Reed) was one factor, and the Bucs' futility during the period (they went 10–38 from 1983 to 1985—the start of a 12-year stretch of 10-loss seasons) also helped the Bandits' success. Another key factor in the Bandits' success was the fact that there was no Major League Baseball team in Tampa at the time (the Tampa Bay Devil Rays would not debut for another decade), meaning that unlike other USFL teams, they did not have to compete with a baseball team for spectators. Due to broad local support, the Bandits were one of a very few USFL teams with a stable home and steady finances - they were the only franchise to have the same coach, owner, and home city throughout the league's three-year existence. Due to these factors, the Bandits are considered one of the few USFL teams that had the potential to be a viable venture had the league been better run. The Philadelphia Stars played Tampa Bay at Wembley Stadium in an exhibition game on July 21, 1984.

1983 season

1983 schedule and results

Sources

1983 Opening Day Roster

1984 season
In week three of the 1984 season, the Bandits faced their inter-state rivals, the Jacksonville Bulls for the first time. Jacksonville was 1-1, after soundly defeating the Washington Federals and nearly beating the New Jersey Generals. Jacksonville, led by former Jets and Broncos quarterback Matt Robinson, raced out to a 12–0 lead. The Bandits stormed back to take a 25–18 lead. The Bulls came back to tie the game, but the Bandits won when Zenon Andrusyshyn kicked a field goal to give Tampa Bay a 28–25 lead.

When the season was over, quarterback John Reaves was the leading passer on the squad. Running backs Greg Boone and Gary Anderson ran for 1,009 and 1,008 yards respectively. Eric Truvillion lead the receivers with 1,044 yards on 70 catches and nine touchdowns.

1984 schedule and results

Sources

1985 season

1985 schedule and results

Sources

The end of the Bandits and of the USFL
Bandits' majority owner John Bassett was a strong proponent of the "Dixon Plan", which was a plan formulated by the USFL's founding owners that sought to build a sustainable league with budgetary restraint and a commitment to spring football. However, to gain a competitive advantage and draw attention to their teams, some owners attempted to sign more high-profile players to free agent contracts, sometimes engaging in bidding wars against more financially powerful NFL teams. This led to USFL teams losing substantial amounts of money, causing much instability throughout the league. The Bandits did not overspend on player contracts, keeping the franchise stable but making it difficult to compete with the USFL's higher-spending teams, despite making a very good account of themselves on the field.

In April 1985, the USFL (led by New Jersey Generals owner Donald Trump) voted 12–2 to switch to a fall schedule for 1986, hoping to compete directly with the NFL and possibly force the more established league to accept a merger. Bassett, who had registered one of the two "nay" votes, immediately declared his intention to pull the Bandits out of the USFL and organize a new spring football league.

However, by mid-1985, the Bandits' ownership group was in disarray. Bassett was diagnosed with terminal brain cancer, and staffers suspected that his illness was impairing his judgment. At the same time, co-owner Steve Arky's wealth was raided by the Securities and Exchange Commission on fraud charges, triggering the savings and loan crisis; Arky committed suicide not long after. The team began signing mediocre players, most infamously defensive back Bret Clark, to large contracts, and plans for a new spring football league were abandoned. The size of the contracts, particularly Clark's contract, led Spurrier and other team officials to question whether Bassett was acting or thinking rationally. As his condition worsened, Bassett decided to sell the team. He died in May 1986. Before his death, he unsuccessfully tried to merge the Bandits organization with the Orlando Renegades (whose owner Donald Dizney had previously held a stake in the Bandits, but rejected the merger out of loyalty to Orlando) and Jacksonville Bulls (whose owner Fred Bullard expressed interest, but only if the Bandits owners stayed on as investors in the merged team).

In August 1985, minority owner Lee Scarfone, a local architect, agreed to purchase Bassett's and Arky's stakes and field a team in the USFL for the fall 1986 season, with Tony Cunningham coming on as an additional partner. In March 1986, Bret Clark took the Bandits to arbitration for $159,980 in back pay owed under his contract. He won the case on May 29, but the Bandits did not have any funds available to pay the judgement, as Scarfone and Cunningham had gone into considerable debt to buy the team and had already depleted most of their assets.  On August 4, a federal judge placed a lien on the franchise and ordered that the franchise's remaining assets -  including everything from weight-lifting equipment to office furniture to memorabilia from the team store - be confiscated to pay off the debt, all but ending any realistic chance of the Bandits returning to the field. With the USFL failing to win the necessary money from its antitrust lawsuit to continue operating, and suddenly without one of its most financially successful franchises, the league suspended operations the same day, never returning to play.

Prominent Tampa Bay Bandits
Gary Anderson
Jim Fitzpatrick
Lex Luger
Nate Newton
Chuck Pitcock
John Reaves
Ron Simmons
Steve Spurrier, head coach

Single-season leaders
Rushing Yards: 1206 (1985), Gary Anderson

Receiving Yards: 1146 (1983), Danny Buggs

Passing Yards: 4183 (1985), John Reaves

Season-by-season results

|-
|1983 || 11 || 7 || 0 || 3rd Central || --
|-
|1984 || 14 || 4 || 0 || 2nd EC Southern || Lost Quarterfinal (Birmingham)
|-
|1985 || 10 || 8 || 0 || 5th EC || Lost Quarterfinal (Oakland)
|-
!Totals || 35 || 21 || 0
|colspan="2"| (including playoffs)

Proposed revivals
In February 2014, the A-11 Football League (A11FL) announced its intention to revive the Tampa Bay Bandits name and logos as one of the eight charter franchises for a new spring league. The A11FL also announced plans to feature the revived Bandits in a "showcase game" to be held at Tampa's Raymond James Stadium in May 2014. However, these plans did not come to fruition, as the A11FL never took the field. The showcase game was cancelled in March 2014, and the league went on permanent "hiatus" in July 2014.

The Spring League acquired the trademarks of the Bandits in 2021 as part of a planned relaunch of the USFL and included a Bandits squad in its 2022 USFL season. The 2022 Bandits are based in Tampa Bay in name only, as the entire league plays all of its games in Birmingham, Alabama.

References

 
1982 establishments in Florida
1986 disestablishments in Florida